The 1991–92 Danish Cup was the 38th installment of the Danish Cup, the highest football competition in Denmark.

Final

References

1991-92
1991–92 domestic association football cups
Cup